The 2010 Temple Owls football team represented Temple University during the 2010 NCAA Division I FBS football season. The Owls, led by fourth-year head coach Al Golden, compete in the East Division of the Mid-American Conference and played their home games at Lincoln Financial Field. They finished the season 8–4, 5–3 in MAC play and were the only team with more than 6 wins to not be invited to a bowl game.

Schedule

Game summaries

vs. Villanova

Getting revenge for last year in which Temple blew a 10-point lead to lose to Villanova 27–24, the Wildcats this time seemed to have Temple on the ropes. Villanova did not punt until the fourth quarter, but Temple's victory, aided by missed field goals and interceptions, was sealed very late in the game. Temple took an early 7–0 lead, then Villanova made it 14–7 after two quick touchdown passes, but Temple made it 14–10 by halftime. The only scoring of the third quarter saw Temple close the gap to one point, but Villanova retook the lead with a touchdown, which was soon answered by a Temple field goal, then Temple took the lead with a touchdown strike to make it 22–21, missing the two-point conversion. Villanova retook the lead late in the fourth to go up 24–22 with a field goal, but Temple answered with one of their own to retake the lead 25–24 with one second left. Then, in a wild finish, Villanova's attempt to win the game ended with Temple running a fumble back for the final points to set the score at 31–24 which belied the wild play seen late in the fourth.

vs. Central Michigan

Upsetting reigning MAC champion Central Michigan, who finished ranked last year, the Owls were in control for three and a half quarters until a late field goal made it a tied ballgame, but Temple retook control in overtime to set themselves at their first 2–0 start in years.

NFL Draft
1st Round, 30th Overall Pick by the New York Jets—Jr. DE Muhammad Wilkerson

2nd Round, 54th Overall Pick by the Philadelphia Eagles—Sr. S Jaiquawn Jarrett

References

Temple
Temple Owls football seasons
Temple Owls football